Jacob Simon (born March 13, 1997) is an American pair skater. With former partner Lindsay Weinstein, he won the junior silver medal at the 2016 U.S. Championships and placed 9th at the 2016 World Junior Championships. He competed at the 2018 U.S. Championships in the senior division with current partner Alexandria Yao, after teaming up in May of 2017.

Personal life 
Jacob Simon was born March 13, 1997, in Evanston, Illinois. In 2015, he graduated from Highland Park High School in Highland Park, Illinois, and enrolled at the University of Colorado in Colorado Springs, Colorado.

Career 
Simon began skating in 2005. He competed with Francesca Block in the 2008–09 season and then with Elizabeth Egbers, from 2009–10 through 2012–13.

Partnership with Weinstein 
Weinstein and Simon began their partnership in April 2013 at Twin Rinks Ice Pavilion in Buffalo Grove, Illinois. Competing on the novice level, they won the pewter medal (fourth place) at the 2014 U.S. Championships.

The pair's ISU Junior Grand Prix (JGP) debut came in the 2014–15 season; they placed 5th in Ostrava, Czech Republic, and 7th in Dresden, Germany. At the 2015 U.S. Championships, they finished fourth on the junior level. They were coached by Jeremy Allen and Kristen Mita in Illinois.

In the summer of 2015, Weinstein/Simon moved to Colorado Springs, Colorado, where they are coached by Dalilah Sappenfield and Drew Meekins. They won the junior silver medal at the 2016 U.S. Championships and were named in the U.S. team to the 2016 World Junior Championships in Debrecen. The pair finished 9th overall in Hungary after placing 8th in both segments.

Partnership with Yao 
Yao and Simon partnered up in May of 2017 and made their debut at the 2018 U.S. Championships on the senior level. They placed 14th overall, with a combined score of 128.12.

Programs

With Yao

With Weinstein

Competitive highlights 
JGP: Junior Grand Prix

With Weinstein

With Egbers

References

External links 
 

1997 births
American male pair skaters
Living people
People from Evanston, Illinois
20th-century American people
21st-century American people